Group A of the 2007 AFC Asian Cup was one of four groups of nations competing at the 2007 AFC Asian Cup. The group's first round of matches began on 7 July and its last matches were played on 16 July. All six group matches were played at venues in Bangkok, Thailand. The group consisted Thailand (the host of the tournament) as well as Iraq, Australia and Oman.

Overall

All times are UTC+7.

Thailand vs Iraq

Australia vs Oman

Oman vs Thailand

Iraq vs Australia

Thailand vs Australia

Oman vs Iraq

Notes 

Group
2007 in Thai football
Group
2007–08 in Omani football
2007 in Australian soccer